Kantlia is a census town in Domjur CD Block of Howrah Sadar subdivision in Howrah district in the Indian state of West Bengal. It is a part of Kolkata Urban Agglomeration.

Geography

Demographics
As per 2011 Census of India Kantlia had a total population of 9,567 of which 4,879 (51%) were males and 4,688 (49%) were females. Population below 6 years was 1,054. The total number of literates in Kantlia was 6,846 (80.42% of the population over 6 years).

Kantlia was part of Kolkata Urban Agglomeration in 2011 census.

 India census, Kantlia had a population of 7371. Males constitute 52% of the population and females 48%. Kantlia has an average literacy rate of 67%, higher than the national average of 59.5%: male literacy is 73% and female literacy is 61%. In Kantlia, 13% of the population is under 6 years of age.

Transport

Bus
Amta Road (part of State Highway 15) is the artery of the town.

Private Bus
 63 Domjur - Howrah Station
 E44 Rampur - Howrah Station
 K11 Domjur - Rabindra Sadan

Mini Bus
 16 Domjur - Howrah Station
 31 Makardaha - Khidirpur
 34 Purash - Howrah Station
 35 Hantal - Howrah Station

CTC Bus
 C11 Domjur - B.B.D. Bagh/Belgachia
 C11/1 Munsirhat - Howrah Station

Bus Routes Without Numbers
 Bargachia - Sealdah Station (Barafkal)
 Pancharul - Howrah Station
 Udaynarayanpur - Howrah Station
 Rajbalhat - Howrah Station
 Tarakeswar - Howrah Station

Train
Dansi railway station and Jhaluarbar railway station are the nearest railway stations on Howrah-Amta line.

References

Cities and towns in Howrah district
Neighbourhoods in Kolkata
Kolkata Metropolitan Area